The Europe Cup (also known as European Badminton Club Championships) is a badminton team championships played by clubs from all around Europe, comparable to the UEFA Champions League in football.
It was established in 1978 by the members of Badminton Europe.

Championships

Finalists

 In 2006 the CB Rinconada team for the final included a player who was not qualified to play for them. The title was subsequently awarded to the runners-up, IMBC 92 (Issy Les Moulineaux BC 92). The losers of the two semifinals were promoted to joint second place. Thus for the first time in history, two teams emerged as silver medalists.

Championships by clubs

References

 
Badminton tournaments
Badminton tournaments in Europe
European international sports competitions
Recurring sporting events established in 1978
Multi-national professional sports leagues
1978 establishments in Europe